Créteil–L'Échat is a station on line 8 of the Paris Métro in the commune of Créteil. Situated in an open cut segment, it is the last exposed station on the Line 8 before going into central Paris.

History 
The station opened on 24 September 1973 with the extension of the line from Maisons-Alfort-Les Juilliottes. It was the southeastern terminus of the line until its extension to Créteil–Préfecture on 9 September 1974. It is named after the Échat district of Créteil.

In 2017, construction started on line 15's station and is expected to open in 2025 and is underground.

In 2019, the station was used by 2,253,948 passengers, making it the 229th busiest of the Métro network, out of 302 stations.

In 2020, the station was used by 1,209,224 passengers amidst the COVID-19 pandemic, making it the 213th busiest of the Métro network, out of 305 stations.

In February 2021, the station was renovated with the addition of another island platform and a new ticketing hall, along with the modernisation of equipment to cater for the increased traffic expected when line 15 opens in late 2025. In March 2021, the station also received 2 paintings by the artist RAF URBAN as part of his DIVERSITY IS HOPE project.

On 20 December 2021, the last tunnel boring machine, Marina, for line 15 south reached Créteil–L'Échat, thus completing the digging of line 15 south's tunnels after more than 3 years, and the start of a new construction phase with the installation of equipment in the station and tunnels.

Passenger services

Access 

 Access 1: Rue Gustave Eiffel Hôpital Henri Mondor
 Access 2: Voie Félix Eboué
 Access 3: Avenue du Général de Gaulle Galerie commercial
 Access 4: Rue Albert Einstein

Station layout

Platforms 
Créteil–L'Échat is an aboveground station and originally had a single island platform flanked by 2 tracks, with an unused siding towards the west side of the station. On 12 February 2021, an additional island platform was commissioned such that each direction (Balard and Créteil-Pointe du Lac) has their own platform in anticipation of heavier traffic once line 15 opens in late 2025.

Other connections 
Créteil–L'Échat is also served by lines 104, 172, 217, and 281 of the RATP bus network, by lines B, O1, and O2 bus of the Transdev STRAV network, by line 100 of the Transdev Lys network, and at night, by lines N32 and N35 of the Noctilien bus network.

Gallery

References 

Paris Métro stations in Créteil
Railway stations in France opened in 1973